The Santa Inês is a breed of sheep from Brazil. As woolless hair sheep, the breed is primarily raised for meat, and is the one of the largest and most productive hair sheep breeds common to Brazil. It is thought to have derived from crosses of the Morada Nova, Bergamasca, Somali sheep and native coarse-wooled sheep.
 Santa Inêz are well-adapted for tropical climates, such as with higher parasite resistance than other meat sheep breeds.

References 

Sheep breeds originating in Brazil
Sheep breeds